Janet-Laine Green (born December 31, 1951) is a Canadian actress, director, producer and teacher, active for over 25 years. Best known for her roles in She's the Mayor, Seeing Things and This is Wonderland, this Toronto-based film and television personality has also been a voice actress for animated series such as Jacob Two-Two (as Florence), Franklin, Little Bear (as Mother Bear) and The Care Bears (for which she voiced Wish Bear).

She also provided the voice of the arch villain Xayide in the animated version of The Neverending Story and also Void in WildC.A.T.S..

She has also worked as an associate producer on the film The Circle Game in which she also played as Anna.

Green has been nominated for three Gemini Awards and two Genie Awards.

She is also active on the Canadian stage. In fact, Theatre Saskatchewan has given the province's best stage actors, since 1992, a Lifetime Achievement Award named after her; Green even sponsors it.

Green is the mother of Goosebumps and Redwall actor Tyrone Savage. Her husband, Booth Savage, wrote the play version of Pillow Talk, which Green is now starring in and producing.

She has a production company of her own, Briefcase Productions.

Filmography

Film

Television

Video games

Awards and nominations

References

External links

Janet-Laine Green at Northernstars

1951 births
Actresses from Toronto
Canadian film actresses
Canadian television actresses
Canadian voice actresses
Living people